WIOC (105.1 FM) is a radio station broadcasting a bilingual Top 40/CHR format. Licensed to Ponce, Puerto Rico, the station serves the Puerto Rico area. WIOC was founded in 1965. The station is currently owned by International Broadcasting Corporation.

References

External links

IOC
1965 establishments in Puerto Rico
Radio stations established in 1965
Contemporary hit radio stations in Puerto Rico